Cowra Airport  is a small airport located  west southwest of Cowra, New South Wales, Australia. The airport serves as the home to Brumby Aircraft Australia, a manufacturer of light sport and general aviation aircraft. Under a partnership deal signed between Brumby Aircraft and Aviation Industry Corporation of China in 2014, the companies have announced plans to establish an airport.

See also
List of airports in New South Wales

References

Airports in New South Wales